Mauritanian People's Party (PPM, French Parti du peuple mauritanien; Arabic: حزب الشعب الموريتاني Hizb Al-Sha'ab Al-Muritaniy) was the sole legal party of Mauritania from 1961 to 1978. It was headed by President Moktar Ould Daddah.

Daddah founded the party shortly after Mauritania's independence from France in November 1960 by merging his Mauritanian Regroupment Party with opposition parties including Association de la Jeunesse Mauritanienne, Nahda, the Union National Mauritanienne, and the Union Socialiste des Musulmans Mauritaniens. The parties were united at a meeting of their political leadership in December 1961, and Daddah proceeded to enact a range of repressive laws, banning alternative political parties and bestowing virtually unlimited power upon the Presidency.

Following the July 1978 coup led by Mustafa Ould Salek, Mauritania's civilian leadership was replaced with military rule and the party was abolished and banned.

Electoral history

Presidential elections

National Assembly elections

References 

Banned socialist parties
Defunct political parties in Mauritania
Islamic socialist political parties
Parties of one-party systems
Political parties disestablished in 1978
Political parties established in 1960
Socialist parties in Mauritania